David Mewes (born 7 October 1976) is a retired German decathlete. His personal best score was 8108 points, achieved in June 2000 in Götzis.

Achievements

References

1976 births
Living people
German decathletes